Nigrin is a surname. Notable people with the surname include:

 Jiří Nigrin (died 1606), printer from Prague
 Albert Gabriel Nigrin, American cinema studies lecturer
 Michael Benjamin Nigrin, Canadian musician and composer

See also
 Nigrine